
 
The Uetliberg (also known as Üetliberg) is a mountain in the Swiss plateau, part of the Albis chain, rising to . The mountain offers a panoramic view of the entire city of Zürich (to the northeast of its summit) and the Lake of Zurich (to the east), and lies on the boundary between the city of Zürich and the municipalities of Stallikon and Uitikon. The summit, known as Uto Kulm, is in Stallikon.

At the summit, there is the Hotel Uto Kulm, together with two towers. One of these is a look-out tower (access costs , rebuilt 1990), whilst the other is the Uetliberg TV-tower (186 m, rebuilt 1990).

The summit is easily accessible by train from Zürich. It is the terminus of the Uetliberg line, and is linked to Zürich Hauptbahnhof by S-Bahn Zürich service S10. Trains usually run every half-hour, taking 20 minutes.

There are numerous walking paths leading up to the top from Albisgüetli, Triemli or Albisrieden with frequent water fountains and camping spots. Uetliberg also has a downhill mountain bike track which starts in the camping area at the top of the mountain and finishes next to Triemli railway station, also served by the S10. A panoramic footpath leads along the crest of the Albis ridge to Felsenegg, from where the Adliswil-Felsenegg cable car connects to Adliswil and the S4 S-Bahn service in the valley below.

The Uetliberg gives its name to the Zürich-based Uto section of the Swiss Alpine Club, and hence to the Uto Peak in the Selkirk Mountains of Canada, which was first climbed by members of the Uto section.

Gallery

See also
 Oppidum Uetliberg
List of mountains of Switzerland accessible by public transport

References

External links 
 
Official Tourism Page Information

Mountains of Switzerland under 1000 metres
Mountains of the canton of Zürich
Tourist attractions in Zürich